Rezendes is a surname. Notable people with the surname include:

Dave Rezendes (born 1959), American NASCAR driver
Michael Rezendes, American journalist

See also
Resendes
Rezende